Jonas Arthur Berry (December 16, 1904 – September 27, 1958) was a Major League Baseball relief pitcher.  The ,  right-hander played for the Chicago Cubs, Philadelphia Athletics, and Cleveland Indians.

Career
Berry spent 18 seasons in the minor leagues before World War II gave him a chance to pitch regularly in the big leagues. He pitched in two games for the Cubs in 1942, and then made an impact with the Philadelphia A's two years later. The 39-year-old rookie won 10 games in relief and saved 12 more, tying for the league lead in that category. He also led the league with 47 games finished, and his earned run average was 1.94.

In 1945, at age 40, Berry led the league in games pitched (52) and games finished (40), and had another great ERA (2.35).  On July 21st of that same year, he pitched eleven scoreless innings of relief in a 24 inning 1–1 tie against the Detroit Tigers.

On July 1, 1946, Berry was purchased from the A's by the Cleveland Indians and continued to be effective, but not as good as he had been the previous two years. He was also 41 then, the fourth oldest player to appear in an American League game that season. In  innings he was 3–7 with a 3.22 ERA.

Career totals include a record of 21–22 in 133 games, 294 innings pitched, 105 games finished, 18 saves, and an ERA of 2.45.

Berry had several types of curveballs, a slider, a fastball, and a screwball used as a changeup.

Death 
Berry died in an automobile accident in Anaheim, California.

See also
 List of Major League Baseball annual saves leaders

References

External links

Major League Baseball pitchers
Baseball players from Arkansas
Chicago Cubs players
Philadelphia Athletics players
Cleveland Indians players
Road incident deaths in California
1904 births
1958 deaths
Screwball pitchers
Vernon Dusters players
Laurel Lumberjacks players